The Newlands Stadium, referred to as DHL Newlands for sponsorship reasons,
is located in Cape Town, South Africa. The stadium has a capacity of 51,900 people, but is not an all-seater venue.

Various sports teams use the stadium as their home base, including:
 Stormers in Super Rugby
 Western Province in the Currie Cup

Tenants Stormers finished in first place in the 2012 Super Rugby season for the first time in their history. Western Province also use the venue for home games. The city's soccer clubs Ajax Cape Town, Santos and the dissolved club Vasco da Gama have in the past occasionally hosted matches at the Newlands Stadium.

History
The decision to buy the ground the stadium stands on was made by the Western Province Rugby and Football Union in 1888. The first official match at Newlands took place on 31 May 1890 when Stellenbosch defeated Villagers there in front of a crowd of about 2,400 people. The following year the stadium hosted its first rugby test when the British Lions toured South Africa.

It was not until 1919 that the first permanent concrete stands were erected on the grounds. Later, in 1927, the new grandstand was erected and the field layout was changed to run from north–south. Yet more changes came in 1931 when the South stand was also enlarged.

In the 1950s parts of a new grandstand as well as South stand were completed, facilities such as lifts and a Presidential room were added, a fourth bay was added to the grandstand, and an extension was added to the lower gallery.

The 1970s saw the stadium change once again as the headquarters of SA Rugby moved to Newlands,  and several stands were built or renovated, while the 1980s saw private suites and function rooms erected on top of the North stands as well as demolition of the old South stand and inauguration of the new Danie Craven stand (also with private suites and function rooms). The 1980s also saw 10,253 seats added to the stadium.

Between 1990 and 1995 the stadium was under constant renovation, adding technology, increasing capacity, and upgrading facilities, as part of a 3-phase redevelopment plan in anticipation of the 1995 Rugby World Cup, when Newlands hosted the opening match of the tournament.

After the World Cup, development continued with several redevelopment and expansion projects to make the stadium more modern and increase capacity. There are four main stands at Newlands: the all-seated Grandstand and Railway stands along both sidelines, and the Danie Craven and Jan Pickard stands behind the goals. Both of the end stands feature many of the ground's corporate boxes: the Craven stand also has a large standing terrace area, while the alcohol-free Pickard stand is mostly seating while also playing home to the stadium's video screen.

The stadium's name was changed several times by various sponsors, first from Newlands to Norwich Park Newlands in 1996, then to Fedsure Park Newlands in 2000 due to a merger between Fedsure and Norwich, and finally back to simply Newlands by Investec when they became the main sponsor in 2002. In late 2005, Vodacom became the stadium's main sponsor, but followed Investec's precedent and kept the stadium name as Newlands. However, since 2011 the ground has been known as DHL Newlands after Western Province and the Stormers changed sponsors.

1995 Rugby World Cup 

In 1995 the stadium was one of the host venues for the Rugby World Cup held in South Africa. The stadium hosted two pool games in Pool A. The stadium also hosted one quarter final with England defeating Australia 25–22. The stadium was then used for the semi final between England and New Zealand, with England losing 29–45.

Future

It was speculated that WP rugby would sell Newlands, and that the Stormers and Western Province would play their home matches at the newly built Cape Town Stadium for their home games. However, the Western Province Rugby Union decided at the time that they would not be using the stadium, but would rather remain at Newlands.

This changed in 2020 when it was confirmed that the stadium would be sold to a preferred bidder via a sealed-envelope bidding process and demolished in 2022 for residential and retail developments to be built. The sale was delayed when a group of former rugby players, led by former Springbok, Wynand Claasen, submitted an application to have the stadium declared a heritage site. As of 1 March 2023 this process is still ongoing.

It was reported on 1 March 2023 that Cape Town Stadium has become the official home of Western Province Rugby after the union signed an Anchor Tenant Agreement.

References

External links
 Western Province Rugby website
 Website of the Stormers rugby union team
Photos of Stadiums in South Africa at cafe.daum.net/stade

Soccer venues in South Africa
Rugby union stadiums in South Africa
Rugby World Cup stadiums
South Africa
Sports venues in Cape Town
Sports venues completed in 1888
Newlands, Cape Town
19th-century architecture in South Africa